Nebojša Prtenjak (born 10 May 1983) is a Serbian professional footballer who plays as a winger.

Career
Born in Čačak, Prtenjak started out at Mladost Lučani, making his debut during the 2001–02 First League of FR Yugoslavia, as the club suffered relegation to the Second League. He later switched to fellow Second League club Srem in the 2002–03 winter transfer window. While playing at Stadion Promenada, Prtenjak was teammates with two future Serbia national team players, Branislav Ivanović and Igor Đurić. He later joined Mladost Apatin, making his Serbian SuperLiga debut in the competition's inaugural season.

In the summer of 2007, Prtenjak returned to his former club Mladost Lučani. He went on to have his best season ever in the 2007–08 Serbian SuperLiga, scoring nine goals in 24 appearances. When the club withdrew from the league due to financial problems, Prtenjak moved to local rivals Borac Čačak. He played for the club in two games against Ajax in the 2008–09 UEFA Cup and spent a total of three seasons with the Zebre.

External links
 
 
 

Association football midfielders
Expatriate footballers in Kazakhstan
Expatriate footballers in Montenegro
FC Taraz players
First League of Serbia and Montenegro players
FK Borac Čačak players
FK Čelik Nikšić players
FK Dečić players
FK Mladost Apatin players
FK Mladost Lučani players
FK Sloboda Užice players
FK Srem players
FK Voždovac players
Kazakhstan Premier League players
Montenegrin First League players
Serbian expatriate footballers
Serbian expatriate sportspeople in Kazakhstan
Serbian expatriate sportspeople in Montenegro
Serbian First League players
Serbian footballers
Serbian SuperLiga players
Sportspeople from Čačak
1983 births
Living people